Chambers County is the name of two counties in the United States:

 Chambers County, Alabama
 Chambers County, Texas